Gulf states may refer to:

 Member states of the Gulf Cooperation Council: Bahrain, Kuwait, Oman, Qatar, Saudi Arabia and the United Arab Emirates
 Arab states of the Persian Gulf
 Gulf Coast of the United States: Alabama, Florida, Louisiana, Mississippi and Texas

See also
 Gulf (disambiguation)